Tasmania is an island territory, south of the Australian mainland.

Tasmania  may also refer to:

Places
Colony of Tasmania, a British colony on the island of Tasmania from 1856 until it became an Australian state in 1901
Tasmania Islands, an uninhabited group of islands in Canada

Vessels
HMAS Tasmania, a destroyer that served with the Royal Australian Navy from 1918 until 1928
MV Tasmania, a former escort carrier used as a ferry between France and Australia from 1958 until 1961
Tasmania, a maxi yacht that won the Sydney to Hobart Yacht Race in 1994

Sport
Tasmania Devils (NAB League), an Australian rules football team in the NAB League Boys and NAB League Girls competitions
Tasmania Devils Football Club (VFL), an Australian Rules Football team in the Victorian Football League
Tasmanian Roar, the women's representative cricket team for the state of Tasmania
Tasmanian Tigers, the cricket team that represents the Australian state of Tasmania
Tasmania United, a proposed Hyundai A-League side
SC Tasmania 1900 Berlin, a former German association football club

Other
 Tasmania (album), a 2019 album by Australian psychedelic band Pond
 Tasmania (wine)
 45569 Tasmania, a British LMS Jubilee Class locomotive
 Relational Model/Tasmania, a version of relational modeling published by E.F. Codd in 1979

See also
 Tasman (disambiguation)
 Tasmanian devil
 Taz-Mania